Gary J. Brink is an American set decorator. He won an Oscar in the category Best Art Direction for the film All That Jazz.

Selected filmography
 All That Jazz (1979)

References

External links

American set decorators
Best Art Direction Academy Award winners
Year of birth missing (living people)
Living people